Milenia Fiedler (born 20 December 1966) is a Polish film editor. She graduated in film editing from Film and TV School of the Academy of Performing Arts in Prague and obtained her Ph.D. in 2005.

Among others, she worked with Andrzej Wajda, Janusz Majewski, Wojciech Marczewski, Jerzy Stuhr and Janusz Zaorski. She is the chairman of the Polish Film Editors Society (Polskie Stowarzyszenie Montażystów).

Fiedler was nominated for the Polish Academy Award for Best Editing three times (2002, 2008, 2014). In 2002, she won the award for Weiser, for which she also received the Award for Best Editing during the Gdynia Film Festival.

Selected filmography 
 1997: Czas zdrady
 1999: The Gateway of Europe
 2001: In Desert and Wilderness
 2007: Jutro idziemy do kina
 2007: Katyń
 2009: Tatarak
 2013: Walesa. Man of Hope

References 

Polish film editors
Living people
1966 births